Trent Parke (born 1971) is an Australian photographer. He is the husband of Narelle Autio, with whom he often collaborates. He has created a number of photography books; won numerous national and international awards including four World Press Photo awards; and his photographs are held in numerous public and private collections. He is a member of Magnum Photos.

Life and work
Parke was born and brought up in Newcastle, New South Wales; he now lives in Adelaide, South Australia. He started photography when he was twelve. At age 13 he watched his mother die from an asthma attack. He has worked as a photojournalist for The Australian newspaper.

Martin Parr and Gerry Badger say that Parke's first book Dream/Life is "as dynamic a set of street pictures as has been seen outside the United States or Japan".

In 2003 he and his wife, the photographer Narelle Autio, made a 90,000 km trip around Australia, resulting in Parke's books Minutes to Midnight and The Black Rose.

Parke became a member of the In-Public street photography collective in 2001. He became a Magnum Photos nominee in 2002 and a member in 2007; the first Australian invited to join.

Publications

Publications by Parke
 Dream/Life. Kirribilli, N.S.W, Australia: Hot Chilli Press, 1999. .
 The Seventh Wave: Photographs of Australian Beaches. Kirribilli, N.S.W, Australia: Hot Chilli Press, 2000. Hardback . Paperback . With Narelle Autio. Includes an essay on the beach in Australian culture by Robert Drewe.
 Minutes to Midnight. Paris: Filigranes Éditions, 2005. 32 pages, 20 plates, paperback. .
 Bedknobs & Broomsticks. St. Paul, Minnesota: Little Brown Mushroom, 2010. .
 The Christmas Tree Bucket – Trent Parke's Family Album. Göttingen: Steidl, 2013. .
 Minutes to Midnight. Göttingen: Steidl, 2013. 96 pages, hardback. .
Göttingen: Steidl, 2014. 96 pages, hardback. .
The Black Rose. Adelaide, Australia: Art Gallery of South Australia, 2015. Published to accompany an exhibition at the Art Gallery of South Australia, 14 March – 10 May 2015.
Crimson Line. London: Stanley/Barker, 2020. .
Second edition with subtle changes. London: Stanley/Barker, 2021. .
Cue The Sun. London: Stanley/Barker, 2021. .

Publications with contributions by Parke
So now then. Cardiff: Ffotogallery, 2006. . Edited by Paul Seawright and Christopher Coppock. Photographs by Parke, Shelby Lee Adams, Adam Broomberg & Oliver Chanarin, Chien-Chi Chang, Weng Fen, Julio Grinblatt, An-My Lê Susan Meiselas, Boris Mikhailov, Simon Norfolk, Paul Shambroom, Massimo Vitali and Michael Wesely. Essays by David Campany, "Straight pictures of a crooked world"; Martha Langford, "What use is photography"; and Jan-Erik Lundström, "Look and tell: some further thoughts on the documentary genre". An anthology of international documentary photography commissioned by Hereford Photo Festival. Edition of 1000.
A Year in Photography: Magnum Archive. Munich: Prestel; New York, Paris, London, Tokyo: Magnum Photos, 2010. .
 10 – 10 Years of In-Public. London: Nick Turpin, 2010. .
Magnum Contact Sheets. Edited by Kristen Lubben.
Magnum Contact Sheets. London: Thames & Hudson, 2011. .
Magnum Contact Sheets. London: Thames & Hudson, 2014. . Compact edition.
Magnum Contact Sheets: Trent Parke, The Seventh Wave, 2000 (Collector's Edition). London: Thames & Hudson, 2011. .
The Street Photographer's Manual. London: Thames & Hudson, 2014. . By David Gibson. Includes a chapter on Parke.
The World Atlas of Street Photography. New Haven and London: Yale University Press, 2014. . Edited by Jackie Higgins. With a foreword by Max Kozloff.
Photographers' Sketchbooks. London: Thames & Hudson, 2014. . Edited by Stephen McLaren and Bryan Formhals.
100 Great Street Photographs. Munich, London, New York: Prestel, 2017. By David Gibson. . Contains a commentary on and a photograph by Parke.
Home. Tokyo: Magnum Photos Tokyo, 2018. .

Films

Films by Parke
The Summation of Force – eight channel film directed by Parke, Autio and Matthew Bate

Documentaries about Parke
Dreamlives (2002). Directed and produced by Jennifer Crone. Includes Trent and Autio. 
Trent Parke: The Black Rose (2015). Directed by Catherine Hunter. Includes Parke, Autio and Geoff Dyer. Broadcast on ABC, 21 April 2015.

Awards
1996–1998: 5 Gold Lenses, International Olympic Committee.
1999: Second prize, Daily Life category, World Press Photo Award (for "Bathurst Car Races").
2000: Second prize, Daily Life stories category, World Press Photo Award 1999 (for "The Seventh Wave").
2000: Canon photo essay prize, Sasakawa World Sports Awards.
2001: First prize, Nature stories category, World Press Photo Award 2000, with Narelle Autio (for "Australian Roadkill" series).
2003: W. Eugene Smith Grant from the W. Eugene Smith Memorial Fund.
2005: Third prize, Daily Life category, World Press Photo Award 2004 (for "Wiluna").
2007: Exhibiting Finalist – Australian National Photographic Portrait Prize.
2014: Winner of Photography category, Prudential Eye Awards by Global Eye Program.
2014: Deutscher Fotobuchpreis 2015, Gold medal, Konzeptionell-künstlerische Fotobildbänd (Conceptually-artistic photobook) category, went to Steidl for Minutes to Midnight, along with three other winners.

Exhibitions 
 2000: The Seventh Wave (with Narelle Autio) – Stills Gallery, Sydney.
 2002: Dream/Life and The Seventh Wave (with Narelle Autio) – Canvas International Art Gallery, Amsterdam.
 2002: Dva Pivo Prosim (Two Beers Please) (with Narelle Autio) – Stills Gallery, Sydney.
 2002: Sydney Treasures, Art & About, Sydney.
 2002: Dream/Life & Beyond – Stills Gallery, Sydney.
 2004: Dream/Life and The Seventh Wave (with Narelle Autio) – FotoFreo Photographic Festival, Western Australian Maritime Museum, Fremantle.
 2004: Dream/Life and The Seventh Wave (with Narelle Autio) – Ariel Meyerowitz Gallery, New York.
 2004: Suspended States, Sydney Arts Festival.
 2004: Minutes to Midnight – Part One, Leica Gallery, Germany.
 2005: Minutes to Midnight, Australian Centre for Photography, Sydney.
 2005: Colour Work, Stills Gallery, Sydney.
 2006: Minutes to Midnight, Wollongong City Gallery
 2007: Welcome to Nowhere, Stills Gallery, Sydney. Part of New Blood, Magnum Photos 60th anniversary exhibition. With Antoine D'Agata, Jonas Bendiksen, Mark Power and Alec Soth.
 2008: Christmas Tree Bucket, Stills Gallery, Sydney.
 2009: Minutes to Midnight, Children's Art Gallery, National Gallery of Australia.
 2009: Please step quietly everyone can hear you, Sydney Opera House.
 2010: Survey Show, Hugo Michell Gallery, Adelaide.
 2013: To the Sea with Narelle Autio, Hugo Michell Gallery, Adelaide.
2013: The Christmas Tree Bucket, National Gallery of Australia, 20 December 2013 – 23 February 2014.
 2014: The Camera is God, The 2014 Adelaide Biennial of Australian Art: Dark Heart, Art Gallery of South Australia, Adelaide.
 2014: The Camera is God, Hugo Michell Gallery, Adelaide.
 2015: The Black Rose, Art Gallery of South Australia, Adelaide, 14 March – 10 May 2015. Part of the 2015 Adelaide Festival.
The Crimson Line, Hugo Michell Gallery, 31 October – 23 November 2019

Collections
Parke's work is held in the following public collections:
 National Gallery of Australia, Canberra
 National Gallery of Victoria, Melbourne: 7 prints (as of November 2018)
 National Library of Australia
 Australian National Maritime Museum, Sydney
 Museum of Contemporary Art, Sydney: 1 print (as of November 2018)
 University of Sydney Union, University of Sydney, Sydney

References

External links
Parke's profile at Magnum Photos
Parke's profile at In-Public
Parke discusses Minutes To Midnight (video)
'Trent Parke – Dreamlives (2002) – Australian Story' (video)
Parke at Hugo Michell Gallery

Australian photographers
Living people
Australian photojournalists
Magnum photographers
1971 births
Street photographers
People from Newcastle, New South Wales